Jakob Margido Esp (born 7 June 1943) is a Norwegian actor and writer. He is particularly known for his drag character "Flettfrid Andresen".

He was awarded the Leonard Statuette in 2009.

Personal life
Esp was born in Byneset (later merged with Trondheim) in 1943, a son of farmer Aksel Esp and Agnes Ervik.

Selected works
Flettfrid (LP, 1984)

References

1943 births
Living people
People from Trondheim
Norwegian male radio actors
Leonard Statuette winners
Norwegian writers
Norwegian male stage actors
Drag queens